Matthew Brian DeWitt is a former major league pitcher who briefly played in 29 games with the Toronto Blue Jays (2000–2001) and the San Diego Padres (2002). He also pitched in the minor leagues for the Baltimore Orioles, Milwaukee Brewers and St. Louis Cardinals organizations.

References

External links
, or Retrosheet
Pelota Binaria (Venezuelan Winter League)

1977 births
Living people
American expatriate baseball players in Canada
Arkansas Travelers players
Baseball players from California 
Cardenales de Lara players
American expatriate baseball players in Venezuela
Huntsville Stars players
Johnson City Cardinals players
Long Island Ducks players
Major League Baseball pitchers
Ottawa Lynx players
Peoria Chiefs players
Portland Beavers players
Prince William Cannons players
San Diego Padres players
Sportspeople from San Bernardino, California
Syracuse Chiefs players
Toronto Blue Jays players